Christian Günter (born 28 February 1993) is a German professional footballer who plays as a left-back for and captains Bundesliga club SC Freiburg. He also represents the Germany national team.

On 19 May 2021, Günter was selected for the German squad for UEFA Euro 2020.

Career statistics

Club

International

Honours
Individual
Bundesliga Team of the Season: 2019–20
 kicker Bundesliga Team of the Season: 2021–22

References

External links
 
 
 
 
 

Living people
1993 births
German footballers
Footballers from Baden-Württemberg
Association football defenders
SC Freiburg players
SC Freiburg II players
Bundesliga players
2. Bundesliga players
Regionalliga players
UEFA Euro 2020 players
Germany youth international footballers
Germany under-21 international footballers
Germany international footballers
2022 FIFA World Cup players
People from Villingen-Schwenningen